Gheg (also spelled Geg; Gheg Albanian: gegnishtja, Standard ) is one of the two major varieties of Albanian, the other being Tosk. The geographic dividing line between the two varieties is the Shkumbin River, which winds its way through central Albania. Gheg is spoken in northern and central Albania, Kosovo, northwestern North Macedonia, southeastern Montenegro and southern Serbia by the Albanian dialectal subgroup known as Ghegs.

Gheg does not have any official status as a written language in any country. Publications in Kosovo and North Macedonia are in Standard Albanian, which is based on Tosk. However, some authors continue to write in Gheg.

History
Before World War II, there had been no official attempt to enforce a unified Albanian literary language; both literary Gheg and literary Tosk were used. The communist regime in Albania imposed nationwide a standard that was based on the variant of Tosk spoken in and around the city of Korçë.

With the warming of relations between Albania and Yugoslavia starting in the late 1960s, the Kosovo Albanians—the largest ethnic group in Kosovo—adopted the same standard in a process that began in 1968 and culminated with the appearance of the first unified Albanian orthographic handbook and dictionary in 1972. Although they had until then used Gheg and almost all Albanian writers in Yugoslavia were Ghegs, they chose to write in Tosk for political reasons.

The change of literary language has had significant political and cultural consequences because the Albanian language is the main criterion for Albanian self identity. The standardization has been criticized, notably by the writer Arshi Pipa, who claimed that the move had deprived Albanian of its richness at the expense of the Ghegs. He referred to literary Albanian as a "monstrosity" produced by the Tosk communist leadership, who had conquered anti-communist northern Albania and imposed their own dialect on the Ghegs.

Kosovan language

In post-WWII Yugoslavia there was a project to create a Kosovan language, which would have been largely Gheg. This was in line with Josip Broz Tito's reorganization of the country into a federation of ethnolinguistically defined nations, which relied heavily on language policy to create or reinforce separation of these nations from such neighbors as Bulgaria, and it built on efforts by communist Albania to unite with Yugoslavia. The idea of union was dropped though, in the aftermath of the split between Stalin and Tito in 1948, as Albania sided with Moscow. As a result of this rupture and other factors, no such Kosovan language was ever created. Indeed, in 1974 the Tosk-based standard Albanian was adopted as an official language of Kosovo.

Dialects
The Gheg dialect is divided by four sub-dialects: Central Gheg, Southern Gheg, Northwestern Gheg (or Western Gheg), and Northeastern Gheg (or Eastern Gheg).

Southern Gheg
Southern Gheg is spoken in the ethno-geographic regions of central and, areas of, north-central Albania; among these being: 1) Durrës, which includes its surrounding villages and environs and municipal units of Ishëm and Shijak; 2) Tirana, including the surrounding villages and environs under the municipal units of Petrelë, Dajt, Vorë, Pezë, Ndroq, Zall-Herr, Zall-Bastar, Shëngjergj, Kavajë, and Rrogozhinë (the last two traditionally being grouped with the Durrës region); 3) Elbasan, including its surrounding villages and the settlements under the municipal units of Labinot-Mal, Labinot-Fushë, Bradashesh, Funarë, Krrabë, and Peqin (the last two regions generally speak dialects closer to that of the Durrës and Tirana region); and 4) Librazhd, including the surrounding settlements and those under the ethnographic regions and municipal units of Çermenikë, Qukës, Prrenjas, Hotolisht; and 5) small sub-regions of the Dibër County such as Martanesh.

Southern Gheg can be further broken down into two major groupings: Southwestern Gheg and Southeastern Gheg. The first group includes the dialects spoken in the regions of Durrës, Tirana, and sections of Elbasan such as Peqin and the western villages of Krrabë. The latter group, on the other hand, is spoken in the regions of Elbasan, Librazhd, and Martanesh. The spoken dialects of Shëngjergj, in Tirana, and Krrabë, in Elbasan, act as transitional dialects between the two groups, although the former is closer to the Southwestern group and the eastern villages of the latter with the Southeastern group. 

The dialects of Ishëm, Vorë, Zall-Herr, and Zall-Dajt represent the northernmost extensions of Southern Gheg (specifically Southwestern Gheg), and as such, they show direct influences from Central Gheg (spoken in neighbouring Krujë, Mat, and Bulqizë); thus they can be labelled as transitional dialects.

Certain settlements to the extreme south of the Southern Gheg dialect zone, which are included in the largely Southern Gheg-speaking units, speak transitional dialects depicting both characteristics of Gheg and Tosk Albanian. These include villages such as Dars in Peqin, the coastal villages of southernmost Kavajë, and a number of settlements in Qukës and Hotolisht.

Central Gheg
Central Gheg is a sub-dialect of Gheg spoken in much of north-central Albania, including: Krujë, Mati, Dibër, Luma, and Mirdita. Central Gheg is also spoken outside of Albania, with the majority of Albanians from North Macedonia speaking dialects of Central Gheg - including the divergent idiom spoken in Upper Reka. According to linguists such as Jorgji Gjinari and Xhevat Lloshi, the Central Gheg dialect group represents a sub-group of the larger Southern Gheg zone.

Northern Gheg
 Northeastern Gheg Gjilan, Preshevë, Bujanoc, Prishtinë, Vushtrri, Mitrovicë, Besianë, Medvegjë and the formerly Albanian-populated territories of Niš Sanjak (Niš, Vranje, Toplica District). 
Northwestern Gheg 
or often called as Prizren old dialect is mostly spoken in Prizren, (Shkodër, Shiroka, Vermosh, Selcë, Vukël, Lëpushë, Nikç, Tamarë, Tuzi, Shestani-Kraja, Ulcinj, Bar, Plav, Gusinje, Pejë, Gjakovë, Lezhë and the rest of Malësia)
 One isolated and particularly divergent Northwestern dialect: the Arbanasi dialect of diaspora Albanians in Croatia

The Italian linguist Carlo Tagliavini puts the Gheg of Kosovo and North Macedonia in Eastern Gheg.

Northeastern Gheg
Northeastern Gheg, sometimes known as Eastern Gheg, is a variant or sub-dialect of Gheg Albanian spoken in Northeastern Albania, Kosovo, and Serbia.

The Northeastern Gheg dialectal area begins roughly down from the eastern Montenegrin-Albanian border, including the Albanian districts (Second-level administrative country subdivisions) of Tropojë, Pukë, Has, Mirditë and Kukës; the whole of Kosovo, and the municipalities of Bujanovac and Preševo in Serbia. The tribes in Albania speaking the dialect include Nikaj-Merturi, Puka, Gashi, and Tropoja.

The Albanian speech in roughly around Tetovo and Karadak, in North Macedonia, is sometimes regarded part of Northeastern Gheg.

Calques of Serbian origin are evident in the areas of syntax and morphology. The Northeastern Gheg slightly differs from Northwestern Gheg (spoken in Shkodër), as the pronunciation is deeper and more prolonged.  Northeastern Gheg is considered to be the autonomous branch of Gheg Albanian in turn, the Northeastern Gheg dialects themselves differ greatly among themselves.

The dialect is also split in a few other minority dialects, where the phoneme [y] of standard Albanian is pronounced as [i], i.e. "ylberi" to "ilberi" (both meaning rainbow); "dy" to "di" (both meaning two). In Northeastern Gheg, the palatal stops of standard Albanian, such as [c] (as in qen, "dog") and [ɟ]  (as in gjumë, "sleep"), are realised as palato-alveolar affricates, [t͡ʃ] and [d͡ʒ] respectively.

Northwestern Gheg
Northwestern Gheg, sometimes known as Western Gheg, is a sub-dialect of Gheg Albanian spoken in Northwestern Albania, Southern Montenegro, and Western Kosovo.  The inhabitants of the renowned region of Malësia are Northwestern Gheg speakers.  The tribes that speak this dialect are the Malësor, Dukagjin and other highlander tribes which include (Malësia): Hoti, Gruda, Triepshi, Kelmendi, Kastrati, Shkreli, Lohja, etc., (Dukagjin) : Shala, Shoshi, Shllaku, Dushmani, etc., etc..(Lezhë),...(see Tribes of Albania).

The main contrast between Northwestern Gheg and Northeastern Gheg is the slight difference in the tone and or pronunciation of the respective dialects.  Northwestern Gheg does not have the more deeper sounding a's, e's, etc. and is considered by some to sound slightly more soft and clear in tone compared to Northeastern Gheg, yet still spoken with a rough Gheg undertone compared to the Southern Albanian dialects.  Other differences include different vocabulary, and the use of words like "kon" (been), and "qysh" (how?) which are used in Northeastern Gheg, and not often used in Northwestern Gheg.  Instead Northwestern Gheg speakers say "kjen or ken" (been), and use the adverb "si" to say (how?).  For example in Northeastern Gheg to say "when I was young", you would say, "kur jam kon i ri", while in Northwestern Gheg you would say "kur kam ken i ri, kur jam ken i ri.".

Although there is a degree of variance, Northwestern Gheg and Northeastern Gheg are still very much similar, and speakers of both sub-dialects have no problem understanding and having a conversation with one another.

Differentiations between the Northwestern Gheg dialects themselves are minuscule, unlike the Northeastern Gheg dialects where there is more differentiation.

Phonology
Assimilations are common in Gheg but are not part of the Albanian literary language, which is a standardized form of Tosk Albanian.

Vowels

Oral

Nasal

Examples

See also 
 Albanian dialects
 Arbëresh language
 Arvanitika
 Cham Albanian dialect

References

Bibliography

Further reading

External links

 Albanian Etymology
 ISO Documentation

Albanian dialects